Bronx apartment fire may refer to:

2017 Bronx apartment fire, which left 13 people dead
2022 Bronx apartment fire, which left 17 people dead